Miloš Ćuk (born 21 December 1990) is a Serbian water polo player who plays for Radnički. His most notable achievement with the Serbia national water polo team are the golden medal from the 2012 European Championship held in Eindhoven and the silver medal from the 2011 World Championship in Shanghai. In 2011, he won with Partizan Raiffeisen the National Championship and National Cup of Serbia, LEN Euroleague, LEN Supercup and Eurointer League.

Club career

Partizan Raiffeisen
On 9 November Ćuk scored four goals in the second round of the Euroleague Group in the 10–10 tie against TEVA-Vasas-UNIQA. On 26 November he scored two goals in a 9–6 Euroleague third round win over ZF Eger in Belgrade. He scored a goal on 14 December in the fourth round of the Euroleague, in the 12–8 second defeat to ZF Eger. On 8 February Ćuk scored three goals for Partizan in the fifth round of the Euroleague Group in which his team won without much problem 9–5 against TEVA-Vasas-UNIQA. On 17 February Ćuk scored his first two goals of the Serbian National Championship season, in the third round of the "A League", in an easy 14–2 win against ŽAK. On 1 March Ćuk scored two goals against VK Vojvodina in a 10–9 win in the "A League" fourth round. On 3 March in the fifth round of the "A League", Ćuk scored three goals in a 9–4 home win against VK Beograd.

National career
On 19 January, in the third game at the European Championships, Ćuk scored his first two goals of the tournament in a big and difficult victory against the defending European champions Croatia. The final result was 15–12 for his national team. On 21 January in the fourth match, Ćuk was on the scorers sheet with one goal for his national team in a routine victory against Romania 14–5. On 27 January Ćuk scored a goal in a semifinal 12–8 victory over Italy. On 29 January, Ćuk won the European Championship with his national team beating in the final Montenegro by 9–8. This was his first medal with the national team in European Championships.

Honours

Club
VK Partizan
 National Championship of Serbia (3):  2009–10, 2010–11, 2011–12
National Cup of Serbia (3): 2009–10, 2010–11, 2011–12
LEN Champions League (1): 2010–11
LEN Super Cup  (1): 2011
 Eurointer League (2): 2010, 2011
Eger

National Cup of Hungary (1): 2014–15
Szolnok
National Cup of Hungary (1): 2017–18
HAVK Mladost

National Cup of Croatia (1): 2019–20
Adriatic League (2): 2018–19, 2019–20
VK Radnički Kragujevac
 National Cup of Serbia (1): 2021–22

See also
 Serbia men's Olympic water polo team records and statistics
 List of Olympic champions in men's water polo
 List of Olympic medalists in water polo (men)
 List of world champions in men's water polo
 List of World Aquatics Championships medalists in water polo

References

External links

 
 Miloš Ćuk at Water Polo Association of Serbia (archived)

1990 births
Living people
Sportspeople from Novi Sad
Serbian male water polo players
Water polo drivers
Water polo players at the 2016 Summer Olympics
Medalists at the 2016 Summer Olympics
Olympic gold medalists for Serbia in water polo
World Aquatics Championships medalists in water polo
European champions for Serbia
Competitors at the 2018 Mediterranean Games
Mediterranean Games medalists in water polo
Mediterranean Games gold medalists for Serbia
Universiade medalists in water polo
Universiade bronze medalists for Serbia
Serbian expatriate sportspeople in Hungary